John Arthur Childs (25 April 1904–1963) was an English footballer who played in the Football League for Darlington, Exeter City and Hull City.

References

1904 births
1963 deaths
English footballers
Association football defenders
English Football League players
Shildon A.F.C. players
Darlington F.C. players
Hull City A.F.C. players
Exeter City F.C. players
Accrington Stanley F.C. (1891) players
Durham City A.F.C. players